Nasiruddin Chowdhury (born 9 October 1985) is a Bangladeshi footballer who plays as a defender. He currently plays for Bangladesh premier league side Chittagong Abahani Limited.

Club career

Early years
Born in Chittagong, Nasir played football by spending coaching money to get admission in college. He didn't have boots even before giving trial at Chittagong Pioneer Football League. When the Chittagong league was postponed, Nasir's friend encouraged him to participate in a for the Bangladesh Army Football Team, and although his parents were hesitant, Nasir impressed in the trials and ended up getting selected by the army officials.  Nasir started his career with the army at the 28 East Bengal Regiment of Chittagong Cantonment. After completing his military Nasir travelled to Sri Lanka in 2000 as, the Bangladesh Army participated in football tournament on the occasion of 50 years anniversary of Sri Lanka Army. Former Bangladesh national team coach György Kottán was impressed by Nasir's performance during a friendly match with the Bangladesh national football team at BKSP and offered him a chance to play in the national team. However, the army officials did not give him the permission to leave duty.

In 2004, Army reached the final of the Sher-e Bangla Cup (losing to Narayanganj) with Nasir finishing top-scorer with 5 goals. In 2006, Nasir went to the United Nations peacekeeping mission in Liberia. There he met legendary footballer George Weah. After this encounter, Nasir decided to quit his job at the army and in 2008, he filed a petition with the authorities and returned home. Nevertheless, he was unable to play for any professional club because he did not get permission from the army. Former goalkeeper Aminul Haque came forward to help him. With the help of the then director of Muktijoddha SKC, Major General Amin Ahmed Chowdhury, he finally got a clearance from the army. The next year he joined his hometown team Chittagong Mohammedan SC.

Domestic league journey
After seeing Nasir's performance in the 2009 Super Cup, tournament winning coach Maruful Haque brought Nasir to Dhaka Mohammedan the same year before the 2009–10 Citycell Premier League. Nasir went onto score 6 league goals that season mainly playing as a striker. Nasir went onto join Muktijoddha Sangsad KC, and played for the club for the next to years. On 3 Jun 2012, he scored a crucial goal against Brothers Union to keep Muktijoddha in the title race, however in the end Nasir failed to win his first league title with the club. The same year Nasir joined rising giants Sheikh Jamal Dhanmondi Club where he went onto make win the Bangladesh Premier League & Federation Cup title twice, during his three years with them. During his time at the Dhanmondi based club, Nasir was often used as a striker turned defender due to his eye for a goal. He scored twice against Chittagong Abahani during the  2013–14 season putting his team six point clear at the top of the table, in the end Sheikh Jamal went onto win there second league title that year. He was also regular with Sheikh Jamal DC & Sheikh Russel KC during continental competitions, the following half a decade. In 2016, Nasir returned once more to Chittagong, this time with Chittagong Abahani Limited. He scored during the group-stages of the 2017 Sheikh Kamal International Club Cup against Manang Marshyangdi Club.

In 2017, Nasir joined Abahani Limited Dhaka. He scored the first in a 2-0 win over his former club Sheikh Jamal DC, the win saw Abahani win a record of six Bangladesh Premier League titles. Throughout the season Nasir scored six league goals, again showcasing his goal scoring ability. He was the second highest local goal scorer and was only one goal behind Tawhidul Alam Sabuz, who mainly played as a forward. In 2018, Nasir was caught in a controversy, as he took an advance of Tk 3 lakh from Abahani, confirming he would stay at the club; but later he joined newcomers Bashundhara Kings. Nasir escaped a one year ban from Bangladesh Football Federation evern after Abahani filed a complaint against him. He won the league the league title once more and scored three goals along the way, the following year Nasir returned to Abahani. However, his second stint at the club was disappointing, as an aging Abahani team failed to win the league title once more, losing out to Bashundhara Kings. The next year Abahani released all of there veteran players including Nasir, who went onto join Sheikh Russel KC in 2021.

International career
Serbian coach Zoran Đorđević was the first to include Nasir in Bangladesh the national team. He mainly played as a defender as per the coaches preference. He started his international career during the 2010 AFC Challenge Cup, in Sri Lanka. He captained Bangladesh during the 2013 SAFF Championship, where he injured his head after a collision with Indian defender Nirmal Chettri. He scored his first international goal against Singapore during a friendly, in 2015.

International goals

Honours
Sheikh Jamal Dhanmondi Club
 Bangladesh Premier League: 2013–14, 2014–15
 Federation Cup: 2013–14, 2014–15
 King's Cup (Bhutan): 2014

Abahani Limited
 Bangladesh Premier League: 2017–18
 Federation Cup: 2017

Bashundhara Kings
 Bangladesh Premier League: 2018–19
 Independence Cup: 2018

References 

Bangladeshi footballers
Bangladesh international footballers
Sheikh Jamal Dhanmondi Club players
Muktijoddha Sangsad KC players
Sheikh Russel KC players
Abahani Limited (Dhaka) players
Mohammedan SC (Dhaka) players
Abahani Limited (Chittagong) players
Bashundhara Kings players
Association football defenders
1979 births
People from Chittagong
Living people